Phandebaaz is a 1978 Bollywood action comedy romantic film directed by Samir Ganguly. Starring Dharmendra (in double role), Moushumi Chatterjee, Prem Chopra. The actual heroine was Leena Chandavarkar in this movie but producer replaced Moushumi Chatterjee because she was unable to attend the shooting and she was telling to delay. Hema Malini had a guest appearance in one song.

Plot
Rajkumar Kakkar (Dharmendra), a poor young man, visits to city and meets a lookalike rich person named Rana Shantidas (again Dharmendra) and impersonates him. He falls in love with a rich girl named Shanti (Moushumi Chatterjee) and discloses his true identity to her. Her father Diwan Bunny (Prem Chopra) refuses to accept him, but Rajkumar and Shanti both get married. Rana is blackmailed by Diwan, and him and Rajkumar gate swap and exchange places, but Rajkumar finds himself the target of a bloody pot, and will have to fight against all odds to defeat Diwan.

Cast
Dharmendra as Rajkumar Kakkar/Rana Shantidas (double role)
Moushumi Chatterjee as Shanti (Rajkumar's wife)
Prem Chopra as Diwan Bunny 
Ranjeet as Jaggi Dada
Bindu as Tony 
Satyendra Kapoor as Hukumat Rai(Shanti's Dad)
Jagdish Raj as Police Inspector
Kumari Naaz as Princess Ratna
Krishnakant as Bawji (Restaurant Owner)
Helen as Club Dancer
Bhagwan as Film Director
Tun Tun as Rosie
Brahmachari as Mohan
Mac Mohan as Mac 
Hema Malini as Herself (guest appearance in song)

Songs
Music's were given by R. D. Burman and recorded by Rajkamal Kamalmandir. Lyricist was Anand Bakshi. Audiography was done by Mohinder  Singh. Some of the music had scored well.

References

External links
 

1978 films
1970s Hindi-language films
Films scored by R. D. Burman
Films directed by Samir Ganguly